Michi Kobi (2 November 1924 – 1 March 2016), born Machiko Kobinata Okamoto, was an American actress.

Life
Kobi was born 2 November 1924 in Sacramento, California as Machiko Kobinata Okamoto. Her father, Rikikazu Okamoto, came to America at age 17 in 1902 and became a doctor. In 1923 her father went to Japan, married Ito Kobinata, and brought her to Sacramento. During World War II, following the signing of Executive Order 9066, Kobi and her mother were sent to Tanforan Assembly Center and then Topaz War Relocation Center. 

After the war she went to New York City, seeking to become an actor, and lived there the rest of her life. She studied acting at New York University. In addition to acting on stage, screen, and television, she worked as a model, secretary, and translator. As a translator she worked for the Japan External Trade Organization (JETRO). She was very outspoken about the sanitized depictions of the conditions in the World War II internment camps and also campaigned for an apology and reparations. She left acting due to the few quality roles for Asian women. She died in Manhattan, New York City on 1 March 2016.

Filmography
 1954: "The New Adventures of China Smith" (TV)
 1959: Tokyo After Dark playing Sumi Fukita 
 1960: 12 to the Moon playing Dr. Hideko Murata
 1960: Hell to Eternity playing Sono
 1961: Cry for Happy playing Hanakichi
 1991: American Rickshaw playing Old Madame Luna 
 2004: Law & Order (TV) episode "Gaijin", playing Mrs. Ito

Theater
1963–1964: original Broadway production of "One Flew Over the Cuckoo's Nest" playing 'Nurse Nakamura'

See also
Hiroaki Sato, who knew Kobi for 30 years and wrote an article upon her death

References

External links
 
 Michi Kobi Papers, Tamiment Library and Robert F. Wagner Labor Archives at New York University Special Collections

1924 births
2016 deaths
20th-century American actresses
Actors from Sacramento, California
American actresses of Japanese descent
American film actors of Asian descent
American film actresses
American television actresses
Japanese-American internees
21st-century American women